John Harold Goodwin Morris (February 24, 1902 – September 6, 1959), nicknamed "Yellowhorse", was an American Negro league pitcher from 1924 to 1930.

A native of Little Rock, Arkansas, Morris made his Negro leagues debut with the Kansas City Monarchs during their 1924 Colored World Series championship season. He went on to play for the Detroit Stars and Chicago American Giants through 1930. After his playing career, Morris was involved in the 1946 formation of the West Coast Negro Baseball Association, and in 1949 became a scout for the Chicago Cubs. He died in San Francisco, California in 1959 at age 57.

References

External links
 and Seamheads

1902 births
1959 deaths
Chicago American Giants players
Detroit Stars players
Kansas City Monarchs players
20th-century African-American sportspeople
Baseball pitchers